Rayleigh may refer to:

Science
Rayleigh scattering
Rayleigh–Jeans law
Rayleigh waves
Rayleigh (unit), a unit of photon flux named after the 4th Baron Rayleigh
Rayl, rayl or Rayleigh, two units of specific acoustic impedance and characteristic acoustic impedance, named after the 3rd Baron Rayleigh
Rayleigh criterion in angular resolution
Rayleigh distribution
Rayleigh fading
Rayleigh law on low-field magnetization
Rayleigh length
Rayleigh number, a dimensionless number for a fluid associated with buoyancy driven flow 
Rayleigh quotient
Rayleigh–Ritz method
Plateau–Rayleigh instability explains why a falling stream of fluid breaks up into smaller packets
Rayleigh–Taylor instability an instability of an interface between two fluids

Title of nobility
Baron Rayleigh
Charlotte Mary Gertrude Strutt, 1st Baroness Rayleigh
John William Strutt, 3rd Baron Rayleigh, physicist, winner of a Nobel Prize in 1904
Robert John Strutt, 4th Baron Rayleigh, physicist; son of John William Strutt

Fictional name
Silvers Rayleigh, a fictional character in One Piece

Places 
 Rayleigh, British Columbia, Canada
 Rayleigh, Essex, England
 Rayleigh (lunar crater)
 Rayleigh (Martian crater)

See also

 Raleigh (disambiguation) for a different spelling